The Douvrin family was an all-aluminum inline-four automobile engine designed in the early 1970s and produced from 1977 to 1996 by Compagnie Française de Mécanique, a joint-venture between PSA and Renault located in the town of Douvrin in northern France. This engine is designed by the engineer Jean-Jacques His (father of Formula 1 engines from Renault and Ferrari). It was produced in the same factory as the PRV V6, which also is sometimes known outside France as the "Douvrin" V6. The Douvrin engine is also referred to as the ZDJ/ZEJ engine by Peugeot, and as the J-type engine by Renault.

Construction
This engine had an aluminium alloy block with cast iron liners, and an aluminium alloy head with one overhead camshaft driven by belt.
Its displacement varied from 1995 to 2165 cc.
This engine should not be confused with the PSA-Renault X-Type engine whose displacement varied from 954 to 1360 cc and had a gearbox integrated to the block.
The Douvrin engine on the contrary, had a conventional (external) gearbox setup, and was longitudinally or transversely mounted depending on car model.

2.0
The  was an oversquare design with a single belt driven overhead camshaft, an  bore and stroke.

Though somewhat dull (with only a 6000 rpm redline) and slow in throttle response, the normally aspirated 8-valve versions proved extremely reliable. Mileages of over  without major repairs are not uncommon. The 12-valvers are much livelier and also boast above-average reliability. The turbocharged versions have only average reliability.

Applications

PSA

Renault
It was produced in a variety of configurations for Renault:
 naturally aspirated 8-valve, single-barrel carburetor, from 1978 to 1993
 naturally aspirated 8-valve, double-barrel carburetor, from 1977 to 1992
 naturally aspirated 8-valve, multipoint, Bosch L(U/E) Jetronic fuel injection,  ( with catalytic converter), from 1984 to 1989 (Catalytic converters required in North American market only.)
 naturally aspirated 8-valve, multipoint, BENDIX ECU-driven, fuel injection,  ( with catalytic converter), from 1989 to 1996 
 naturally aspirated 12-valve, multipoint fuel injection, ( with catalytic converter), from 1989 to 1996
 turbocharged 8-valve, multipoint fuel injection,  ( with catalytic converter), from 1987 to 1993 (Catalytic converters fitted IAW EC directive in MY '89; now referred to as EURO III). 

 Renault 18[1]
 Renault 20
 Renault 21
 Renault 25
 Renault Espace
 Renault Fuego
 Renault Safrane
 Renault Trafic

Others
 SIMI Cournil SCE15/25
 Auverland SC 11/200/250

2.2
Most parts, including the cylinder head, were identical to the those of the 2-liter unit.

This engine proved as reliable as its 2.0-liter counterpart. It is often confused with the somewhat similar 2.2 litre Simca Type 180 engine, which displaced

Applications

PSA

Renault
Renault offered the 2.2 in fewer configurations than the smaller version:
 normally aspirated 8-valve, double-barrel carburetor, from 1977 to 1992
 normally aspirated 8-valve, multipoint fuel injection,  ( with catalytic converter), from 1983 to 1996
 normally aspirated 12-valve, multipoint fuel injection, from 1989 to 1996

 Renault Espace
 Renault Fuego
 Renault 18
 Renault 20
 Renault 21
 Renault 25
 Renault Master
 Renault Medallion
 Renault Safrane

Others

 1987-1989 Eagle Medallion
 1983-1992 Winnebago LeSharo (built on Trafic chassis and cab)
 1983-1992 Itasca Phasar (built on Trafic chassis and cab)

2.1 Diesel
Cast-iron cylinder liners were used to withstand the higher compression ratio of Diesel combustion. The cylinder head was of course specific and was a Ricardo-type pre-chamber design fed by a mechanically controlled fuel pump. This engine was only used by Renault in three versions:
 normally aspirated 8-valve, from 1979 to 1992
 turbocharged 8-valve, from 1982 to 1992 - 1),2)
 turbocharged 8-valve with variable-nozzle, from 1990 to 1996
- Garrett T2 turbocharged 8-valve version was fitted by AMC-Renault in the 1984-1987 Jeep Wagoneer, Cherokee and Comanche models
- Garrett T3 turbocharged 8-valve version was fitted by AMC-Renault in the 1983-1986 Winnebago Lesharo/Itasca Phasar, based on the Renault Trafic I 'P'latform chassis, albeit only in FWD, LWB designs.

 Renault 18
 Renault 20
 Renault 21
 Renault 25
 Renault 30
 Renault Fuego
 1992–1996 Renault Safrane
 Renault Espace
 Renault Trafic
 Renault Master
 1983–1986 Winnebago LeSharo (built on Trafic chassis and cab)
 1983–1986 Itasca Phasar (built on Trafic chassis and cab)
 Jeep Cherokee (XJ)
 Jeep Comanche

See also 
 List of PSA engines
 List of Renault engines
 List of engines used in Chrysler products

References 

Française de Mécanique engines
Renault engines
Peugeot engines
Straight-four engines